Heliothis philbyi is a species of moth of the family Noctuidae. It is found in the Middle East, including Saudi Arabia, Iran and Oman.

References

Heliothis
Moths described in 1941